The Igede people are a Nigerian ethnic group in Lower Benue State of Nigeria. They are native to the Oju and Obi local government areas of Nigeria, where 2006 population figures stand at an estimated 267,198 people. However, many Igede people are dispersed across the state and the Nation. For instance, the Igede language is also spoken in Nigeria's Cross River State, and many Igede communities exist in Osun State and Ogun State. The Igede language is a member of the Benue-Congo subgroup of the Niger-Congo language family.

Geographical location
The Oju Local Government Area was created in 1976 and shares boundaries with present-day Obi, Ado, Konshisha and Gwer East Local Government Areas of Benue State, Ebonyi and Izzi Local Government Areas of Ebonyi State, and Yala Local Government Area of Cross River State. It is headquartered in Oju Town.

The Obi Local Government Area was created in 1996 and has its headquarters at Obarike-Ito. The local government area derives its name from the Obi stream that flows in the area and shares boundary with Ado, Otukpo and Oju local government areas of Benue State.

History

Origin: Oral tradition 
The Igede trace their origin to Sabon Gida Ora in present-day Edo state. They are said to be the descendants of Agba, a high chief in Sabon Gida Ora. A skirmish between the Igede and the natives of Ora led to their migration from that region to present-day Benue state through Nsukka in Enugu state. This historical event in Igede history is commonly recounted in song and drama, for instance the record and drama piece "Ego ny'Igede".

Origin: Archival records 
Archival records portray them as migrants from Ogoja province who have increasingly adopted the culture and practices of the Idoma.

Administration and politics
Politically, the Igede falls under the Benue South senatorial district.

Igede culture 
The Igede are predominantly farmers cultivating maize, cassava, groundnut and yams. Igede is home of the popular Igede-Agba festival, a colourful annual celebration that marks the yam harvest season in September.

Igede traditional clothes are blue, black, and white stripes.

Notable Igede people
Ode Ojowu, Chief Economic Adviser to President Obasanjo and CEO National Planning Commission
Oga Okwoche, Former Nigerian Ambassador to France
Peter Okwoche, host of the BBC Focus on Africa TV news magazine programme
 Ogiri Ajene, former Deputy Governor of Benue State
 Dr. Stephen Ijaha, The pioneer rector of Delta State Polytechnic 
 Otefe-Oghara, Late Joel I. Iji, Ace Broadcaster
 Prof. (Chief) John E. Enyi, Lecturer BSU, astute public Administrator and Rural Development

References

Ethnic groups in Nigeria
Idomoid languages